Soul Masters is an album released by Digital Music Group containing twelve songs by Ben E. King. This album is identical to the album Love Is Gonna Get You, but has a different track order.

Track listing

"Take Me To the Pilot" – 3:35
"Travein' Woman" – 3:28
"White Moon" – 2:37
"I Guess It's Goodbye" – 3:24
"Love Is" – 2:53
"Into The Mystic" – 3:40
"Poison In My Wine" – 2:56
"All Of Your Tomorrows" – 4:49
"She Does It Right" – 2:58
"Only You Know And I Know" – 3:15
"The Beginning Of It All" – 3:18
"Love Is Going To Get You" – 3:03

Ben E. King albums
2005 albums